Elena Stefanie Hauer (born 13 February 1986) is a German footballer who last played for MSV Duisburg.

Honours

FCR 2001 Duisburg
Bundesliga: Runner-up (5) 2004–05, 2005–06, 2006–07, 2007–08, 2009–10
German Cup: Winner (2) 2008–09, 2009–10, Runner-up (1) 2006–07
UEFA Women's Cup: Winner (1) 2008–09

Germany
FIFA U-19 Women's World Championship: Winner (1) 2004
UEFA Women's U-19 Championship: Runner-up (1) 2004

External links
 
 

1986 births
Living people
German women's footballers
FCR 2001 Duisburg players
SGS Essen players
MSV Duisburg (women) players
Women's association football defenders
Women's association football midfielders